Aechmea aripoensis is a species of bromeliad native to Venezuela and Trinidad.

Cultivars
 Aechmea 'Raspberry'

References

BSI Cultivar Registry Retrieved 11 October 2009

aripeonsis
Flora of Venezuela
Flora of Trinidad and Tobago
Plants described in 1926
Flora without expected TNC conservation status
Taxa named by N. E. Brown